Before the 2023 Turkish presidential election, there were discussions about the nomination of presidential candidates.

The current president and the leader of the Justice and Development Party (AKP), Recep Tayyip Erdoğan, announced that he is the presidential candidate of the People's Alliance. Other components of the People's Alliance, the Nationalist Movement Party (MHP) and the Great Unity Party (BBP), supported Erdoğan's candidacy.

The Nation Alliance, of which the Republican People's Party, the Good Party and the Democrat Party are members, and the Table of Six, formed by six opposition parties including Democracy and Progress Party, Future Party and Felicity Party, were expected to decide the candidate at the meeting to be held on 13 February 2023. However, the meeting was postponed due to the 2023 Turkey–Syria earthquake. The Nation Alliance held its nomination meeting on 2 March 2023. On 3 March, Good Party leader Meral Akşener announced after the party leadership meeting that Kemal Kılıçdaroğlu's candidacy as the presidential candidate of the Nation Alliance was approved at the meeting on 2 March and said that Good Party left the Table of Six. Three days later, the IYI Party rejoined the Table after its meetings with the CHP. The Nation Alliance announced on 6 March 2023 that Kemal Kılıçdaroğlu was a joint presidential candidate.

Another alliance, the Labour and Freedom Alliance, has not yet announced its presidential candidate.

Muharrem İnce, who was the presidential candidate of the Republican People's Party in the 2018 election and finished second with 30.6% of the vote, announced that he would be a candidate again as the leader of the Homeland Party. The leader of the Patriotic Party, Doğu Perinçek, who alsp was a candidate in the 2018 election, announced that he would be a candidate again. Former Young Party leader Cem Uzan, former MHP deputy Sinan Oğan and doctor Serdar Savaş are among those who announced their candidacy.

Nomination process

People's Alliance 

On 9 June 2022, the leader of the ruling Justice and Development Party and the current president, Recep Tayyip Erdoğan, announced that he will be a candidate in the 2023 presidential election. Erdogan's candidacy was supported by the other member parties of the People's Alliance, the Nationalist Movement Party (MHP) and the Great Unity Party (BBP). MHP leader Devlet Bahçeli has stated more than once that the candidate for the People's Alliance will be Erdoğan. Some lawyers and opposition politicians stated that since Erdoğan was elected president twice in the 2014 and 2018 elections, he could not be a candidate again unless the parliament decided to hold early elections, according to the law. Mustafa Şentop, Ersan Şen, Metin Feyzioğlu and some other lawyers said that the 2018 election was Erdoğan's first term, arguing that a new office was formed, apart from the name similarity, as the presidential system was adopted in 2018. According to Freedom House, Erdoğan has the right to run again in the new system in 2023, as his first term ended early. Stating that Erdoğan cannot be a candidate, the lawyers oppose this view by stating that the maximum term of office in the Constitution has not been changed and in this case, the constitution should be taken as the basis, not the systems.

There have been speculations that if Erdoğan is not a candidate, he will be a joint candidate for power for Minister of Interior Süleyman Soylu and Minister of National Defense Hulusi Akar.

Nation Alliance and Table of Six 

The Nation Alliance founded by the main opposition party, the Republican People's Party, the Good Party and the Democrat Party, and the Table of Six, of which the Felicity Party, DEVA Party and the Future Party are members in addition to this alliance, will elect the presidential candidate to be elected against Erdoğan. It was noted that six political parties will not nominate more than one candidate and will agree on a common candidate in order to "not give the appearance of discrimination and competition". At the meeting of Table of Six on 25 January 2023, it was discussed for the first time how the presidential candidate will be determined. The Nation Alliance and the Table of Six were expected to decide the candidate at the meeting to be held on 13 February. However, the meeting was postponed due to the 2023 Turkey–Syria earthquake. On 3 March, Meral Akşener announced after the Good Party leadership meeting that Kemal Kılıçdaroğlu's candidacy as the presidential candidate of the Nation Alliance was approved at the meeting on 2 March and said that Good Party left the Table. Three days later, the Good Party rejoined the Table of Six after its meetings with the CHP.

On 6 March 2023, the Nation Alliance announced that Kemal Kılıçdaroğlu was a joint presidential candidate.

Kemal Kılıçdaroğlu 
Claims have been made about multiple names within the current main opposition party, the Republican People's Party, that they will run for president. Party leader Kemal Kılıçdaroğlu's candidacy was supported by CHP deputies and mayors such as Parliamentary CHP Group Deputy Chairman Özgür Özel, Deputy Chairman Veli Ağbaba, Antalya Mayor Muhittin Böcek. Despite this, according to the opinion polls, Kılıçdaroğlu is the least likely to win against Erdoğan among the possible candidates to come out of the CHP. The Nation Alliance member, the Good Party, is keeping a distance from Kılıçdaroğlu's candidacy. Apart from the alliance, Muharrem İnce, the leader of the Homeland Party, which does not support Kılıçdaroğlu's candidacy under normal conditions, announced that if Kılıçdaroğlu is a candidate, they will support Kılıçdaroğlu against Erdoğan in the second round of the election.

The Table of Six met on 2 March 2023 to determine the candidate. Although the name of the candidate was determined that day, the name of the candidate would be announced later. At the meeting, it was claimed that all parties, except the Good Party, approved Kemal Kılıçdaroğlu's candidacy, and that day, some Good Party members made some posts to indicate that the party was against Kılıçdaroğlu's candidacy. On 3 March 2023, the Good Party officially decided to leave the Table of Six because it did not support Kemal Kılıçdaroğlu's presidential candidacy. Three days later, the IYI Party rejoined the Table of Six after its meetings with the CHP.

Ekrem İmamoğlu and Mansur Yavaş 
In the 2019 local elections and the repeat Istanbul mayoral election, the presidential candidacy debates continue about Ekrem İmamoğlu, who won the AK Party candidate Binali Yıldırım twice and won the Istanbul mayorship that the AK Party has held since 2004. İmamoğlu is considered one of the strongest candidates to run against Erdoğan in the elections.In his own statement, he said "I do not have an agenda regarding the presidency" and stated that the process will be determined by the Table of Six. Orhun Erktürkmen, who is responsible for the youth policies of the Good Party, said that they support the candidacy of İmamoğlu or Yavaş.

Ankara Mayor Mansur Yavaş, who won against the ruling party's candidate in the 2019 Ankara mayoral election, is among the possible candidates. Yavaş, like Ekrem İmamoğlu, is considered a strong candidate to win against Erdoğan.. He is ahead of Erdogan in most of the presidential election polls. On 6 December 2022, Yavaş answered the question asked about the candidacy by saying, "We will obey whatever the Table of Six says." Orhun Erktürkmen, who is responsible for the youth policies of the Good Party, said that they support the candidacy of İmamoğlu or Yavaş. Victory Party Chairman Ümit Özdağ requested Mansur Yavaş to be nominated.. Özdağ also announced that i Table of Six did not nominate Yavaş, they would propose a candidacy to Yavaş. Peoples' Democratic Party Parliamentary Group Deputy Chairman Meral Danış Beştaş said that they are against Mansur Yavaş's candidacy.

On March 3, 2023, the Good Party officially decided to leave the Table of Six because it did not support Kemal Kılıçdaroğlu's presidential candidacy. On the same day, Meral Akşener called for Ekrem İmamoğlu and Mansur Yavaş to be candidates in her statement. After this call, 5 CHP mayors, including Ekrem İmamoğlu and Mansur Yavaş, met with Kemal Kılıçdaroğlu. After the meeting, Akşener's call was rejected by İmamoğlu and Yavaş. Three days later, the Good Party rejoined the Table of Six after its meetings with the CHP.

Other CHP members 
Hatay mayor Lütfü Savaş and Bolu mayor Tanju Özcan announced that they would accept the presidential candidacy proposal.

Area Research head Murat Karan claimed that if Kılıçdaroğlu did not run, Table of Six would nominate İlhan Kesici.

Other Table of Six members 
Good Party leader Meral Akşener announced that she will not be a presidential candidate and that she will be a prime minister candidate if the strengthened parliamentary system supported by the main opposition is passed. Democracy and Progress Party leader Ali Babacan said he would accept it if he was nominated as a presidential candidate. On 11 March 2022, Kemal Kılıçdaroğlu said that one of the leaders in the Table of Six could be a candidate.

On 6 September 2022, Kemal Kılıçdaroğlu made the statement that "Everyone has the right to be a candidate" for the candidacy of former president Abdullah Gül. Abdullah Gül was also mentioned in the candidacy talks of the opposition in the 2018 Turkish presidential election.

Journalist Nihat Genç claimed that the opposition's candidate would be former Constitutional Court Haşim Kılıç. Good Party Secretary Uğur Poyraz and CHP deputy Gürsel Tekin denied this claim. Tekin said that the candidate would be from the CHP. Journalist Emin Çapa said in a statement on Halk TV that the candidate must be clear and has no ties to politics. Upon this statement, it was claimed that Muhtar Kent or Özgür Demirtaş would be candidates. These allegations were denied by the CHP and it was stated that neither of the two names would be candidates and that they did not have such a potential.

Labour and Freedom Alliance 

It has been speculated that if the Nation Alliance nominated Kılıçdaroğlu, HDP would not nominate a candidate.

Other parties 

Mustafa Sarıgül, the leader of the Party for Change in Turkey, said in a statement on his presidential candidacy in January 2021 that his party would discuss the candidacy and make the decision. After the Nation Alliance's candidate was determined as Kemal Kılıçdaroğlu on 6 March 2023, Sarıgül supported Kılıçdaroğlu's candidacy by saying, "The most suitable candidate for this transition period is Kemal Kılıçdaroğlu at that table."

References 

2023 Turkish presidential election